The Yuri A. Gagarin State Scientific Research-and-Testing Cosmonaut Training Center (GCTC; Russian: Центр подготовки космонавтов имени Ю. А. Гагарина) is a Russian training facility responsible for training cosmonauts for their space missions. It is in Star City of Moscow Oblast, a name which may refer to the facility itself or to its grounds.

Formation

The facility was originally known only as Military Unit 26266 or в/ч 26266, and was a secret training base for Soviet Cosmonaut candidates. The site was chosen for its proximity to Moscow and other infrastructure that would be essential for its function: Chkalovsky Airport, and the Yaroslavl railroad. The densely forested area was originally a radar range with some existing infrastructure.

Military doctor Colonel Yevgeny Karpov was appointed as the first chief of the cosmonaut training centre or Tsentr Podgotovki Kosmonavtov (TsPK) on 24 February 1960. The centre was home to approximately 250 personnel divided into various departments who were responsible for the development of all aspects of the space program ranging from equipment to the well-being of the cosmonauts. These included specialists in heat exchange and hygiene, survival clothing, surgery, and training staff. Initially cosmonaut candidates were housed at the nearby Frunze Central Airfield (Moscow), followed by an apartment block in Chkalovsky before eventually moving to the newly built apartments on site where they would remain with their families throughout training.

Civilian administration
Until April 2009 the center was owned and operated by the Ministry of Defence (Russia) in cooperation with Russian Federal Space Agency. In April 2009, Russia President Dmitry Medvedev signed a presidential decree transferring the center from the Defence Ministry to the Russian Federal Space Agency (Roskosmos).

Key infrastructure
The facility contains infrastructure essential for the training of cosmonauts across a wide range of experiences, including simulating g-loads, mission specific/suit training, medical observation/testing and astronavigation.

Key GCTC facilities include:
Full-size mockups of all major spacecraft developed since the Soviet era, including the Soyuz and Buran vehicles, the TKS modules and orbital stations of the Salyut Program, Mir, and ISS. These were co-existing or with time replaced one another inside two main training hangar halls of the center. Room 1 houses the Salyut 4, 6, Mir (Don-17KS)  with Kvant (Don-37KE), Kvant 2 (Don-77KSD) and Kristall (Don-77KST) modules and a Soyuz 2 descent module simulators. Room 1A houses the Soyuz simulators (Don-7ST3 -old STK-7ST - for the Soyuz TMA;  TDK-7ST4 - old TDK-7TS2 for Soyouz TM - for the Soyuz TMM; Don-732M modified for Soyuz TM and the Pilot 732 - for the TORU docking system). Other rooms house the Salyut 7, Spektr (Don-77KSO), Priroda (Don-77KSI), Buran, Zarya and Zvezda simulators.
Zero-gravity training aircraft for simulating weightlessness (cf. Training aircraft are based at the Russian Air Force base at Chkalovskiy airfield.
A Medical observation clinic and testing facility.
The original office of Yuri Gagarin and a number of monuments and busts to him and other cosmonauts.

Heads of the CTC 
 Yevgeny Karpov (1960–1963)
 Mikhail Odintsov (1963)
 Nikolay Kuznetsov  (1963–1972)
 Georgy Beregovoy* (1972–1987)
 Vladimir Shatalov* (1987–1991)
 Pyotr Klimuk* (1991–2003)
 Vasily Tsibliyev* (2003–2009)
 Sergei Krikalev* (2009–2014)
 Yury Lonchakov* (2014–2017)
 Pavel Vlasov (2017–2021)
 Maksim Kharlamov (since June 2021)

Asterisks (*) denote cosmonauts.

See also
Johnson Space Center

References

External links
 

Neutral buoyancy pools
Human spaceflight
Soviet and Russian space program locations
Monuments and memorials to Yuri Gagarin
1960 establishments in Russia